The Central Division of the Queensland Rugby League is responsible for the promotion, administration and facilitation of rugby league throughout most of regional Queensland. Regional areas include the Darling Downs, Wide Bay–Burnett, the South West, the Central West, and Fitzroy & Mackay.

The Division was formed in 2010 as part of an amalgamation between the then Central, South West and Wide Bay divisions. Shortly after the amalgamation three Regions of Central Rugby League were established. The Division's three Region's are the Capricorn Region responsible for the former Central Division, the South West Region responsible for the former South West Division, and the Wide Bay Region responsible for the former Wide Bay Division.

47th Battalion Shield

 Bundaberg
 Central Highlands
 Gladstone
 Northern Wide Bay
 Rockhampton
 South West Country
 Sunshine Coast
 Toowoomba

47th Battalion Shield: Under 20s
 Bundaberg
 Central Highlands
 Gladstone 
 Rockhampton
 Qld Outback
 South Burnett

47th Battalion Shield: Women's
 Bundaberg
 Capras 
 Mustangs 
 Sunshine Coast

Like the Northern Division's "Foley Shield" or the South-East Division's "Bulimba Cup" the "47th Battalion Shield" is run as a regional Carnival and none of the teams are club teams, with the only exception being some of the Women's teams. Its traditionally held over one weekend and normally at one venue with multiple grounds to play on.

Capricorn Region
The Capricorn Region of the Queensland Rugby League Central Division is responsible for administering the game of rugby league in the Central area of Queensland under the QRL. Formally known as the Central Division until 2010 when it was amalgamated with the South West & Wide Bay divisions to form the current Central Division.

The Region's boundaries take in Miriam Vale and Gladstone to the south, out to Winton in the west and north to Moranbah. There are 3150 players in this region, playing for 25 senior clubs and 32 junior clubs. The Division has four senior Local Leagues. Additionally, Central Region club, Moura, played in the Central Burnett competition until recently becoming defunct. Another Club, Tambo, plays in the Western League competition in the South West Region. The Division is represented by the Central Queensland Capras in the Queensland Cup and formerly also in the Winfield State League.

Notice: The names listed in the brackets above represent the league the player was from and not the club(s) the player was from. No Coach or Captain was named. Had to play at senior level (excludes Central Division Juniors such as Jason Hetherington who left before senior level).

Rockhampton Senior Local Rugby League

Callide-Dawson Junior Rugby League

Gladstone District Rugby League
The Gladstone District Rugby League (GDRL) is a rugby league competition which currently only fields reserve grade. Its most recent season of competition was 2017 for Inter City Womens and 2015 for A-Grade & Under 20s. Today the Rockhampton Senior Local Rugby League incorporates many of the former GDRL clubs' Women's, First Grade and Under 20s sides, and from 2017 until 2021, Gladstone's Reserve Grade teams. 

Gladstone began running its own reserves competition in order to offer senior local competition again from 2022, with other grades continuing to play in Rockhampton.

Central Highlands Rugby League

Noticeable Defunct Clubs: Alpha Brumbies (2004); Bunyip (1997); Capella Roadrunners (2006); Emerald Cowboys(2018); Gemfields Giants (2009 - Premiership 1997); Peak Downs Pirates (2014 - Premierships: 2009, 2011, 2012), Tieri (Premiership 1995). Emerald won premierships in 1998 & 2001. Emerald Seagulls won a premiership in 1996.

Central West Rugby League

South West Region
The South West Region of the Queensland Rugby League Central Division is responsible for administering the game of rugby league in the Southern area of Queensland under the QRL. Formally known as the South West Division until 2010 when it was amalgamated with the Central & Wide Bay divisions to form the current Central Division.

It is also responsible for the Toowoomba Clydesdales team who compete in the Queensland Cup (and formerly the Winfield State League), and the Toowoomba Fillies women's Rugby League team. The representative side, South West Mustangs, currently wear Blue, Gold and White jerseys.

Notice: The names listed in the brackets above represent the league the player was from and not the club(s) the player was from. No Captain was named.

Border Rivers Rugby League

Roma District Rugby League

Toowoomba Rugby League

Wide Bay Region 
The Wide Bay Region of the Queensland Rugby League Central Division is responsible for administering the game of rugby league in the Wide Bay area of Queensland under the QRL. Formally known as the Wide Bay Division until 2010 when it was amalgamated with the Central & South West divisions to form the current Central Division.

The Wide Bay Bulls had previously represented the division in the 1980s and 1990s in the Winfield State League. At that time they wore Mustard and Dark Brown jerseys. They currently wear Red, Black and White jerseys. The Sunshine Coast Falcons currently represent the division in the Queensland Cup.

Notice: The names listed in the brackets above represent the league the player was from and not the club(s) the player was from.

Bundaberg Rugby League

Central Burnett Rugby League

Northern Districts Rugby League

 Biggenden won the 2006 and 2007 A-Grade premierships.
 Miriam Vale and South Kolan contested the 2015 Grand Final

South Burnett Rugby League

Sunshine Coast-Gympie Rugby League

Major Venues
 Browne Park - Rockhampton (8,000 / 5,200 Grandstand seating)
 Clive Berghofer Stadium - Toowoomba (9,000 / 2,300 Grandstand seating)
 Marley Brown Oval - Gladstone (6,000 / 1,000 Grandstand seating)
 Salter Oval - Bundaberg (8,000 / 500 Grandstand seating)
 Sunshine Coast Stadium - Kawana Waters (12,000 / 1,500 Grandstand Seating)

See also

Rugby league in Queensland

References

External links

Queensland Rugby League
2010 establishments in Australia
Darling Downs
Wide Bay–Burnett
South West Queensland
Central West Queensland
Central Queensland